Haifa Hussein (born 22 October 1979) is a Bahraini actress and singer, well known for Khaliji television dramas in her native Bahrain. Haifa begun her career in 1999, she get her famous in her main role in Lakita TV series, she announced her retirement in 2018.

Personal life
Haifa Hussein is married to Emirati Director Habib Ghalloum she has twins from him, and one son from previous marriage.

References

Bahraini television actresses
Living people
1979 births
Place of birth missing (living people)